is the 25th single by Japanese idol duo Wink. Written by Hiroshi Yamada, Katsuo Hana, and Masahiro Ikumi, the single was released on September 15, 1995, by Polystar Records. It was the duo's final single before they disbanded in 1996.

Background and release 
"Angel Love Story (Akiiro no Tenshi)" was used by Triumph International for their Angel Bra commercial.

The single peaked at No. 62 on the Oricon's weekly charts and sold over 8,000 copies.

Track listing

Chart positions 
Weekly charts

Year-end charts

References

External links 
 
 

1995 singles
1995 songs
Wink (duo) songs
Japanese-language songs